Porterwood is an unincorporated community in Tucker County, West Virginia, United States.

The community was named after William Porter, a railroad builder.

References 

Unincorporated communities in West Virginia
Unincorporated communities in Tucker County, West Virginia